The following is a list of stadiums in the United Kingdom with a capacity of 5,000 or more. They are ordered by capacity, which is the maximum number of spectators the stadium can normally accommodate. Capacities are standard total capacity, including seats and any standing areas, and excluding any temporary seating. Most are used for association football (referred to as football hereafter), with others hosting rugby union, rugby league, cricket, athletics, Gaelic football, hurling, camogie, tennis, American football, speedway and greyhound racing.

See also
List of indoor arenas in the United Kingdom
List of stadiums in England
List of English football stadiums by capacity
List of cricket grounds in England and Wales
List of English rugby union stadiums by capacity
List of English rugby league stadiums by capacity
List of Scottish football stadiums by capacity
List of stadiums in Wales by capacity
List of stadiums in Ireland
List of association football stadiums in Northern Ireland
List of Gaelic Athletic Association stadiums
List of European stadiums by capacity

References 

United Kingdom by capacity
Lists of sports venues in the United Kingdom
United Kingdom